Abbas Koty Yacoub (1952–October 22, 1993) was a Chadian political figure and rebel leader.

Koty, a Zaghawa, was Director of the Military Cabinet under Head of State Goukouni Oueddei from 1979 to June 1982, when Oueddei was ousted by Hissène Habré. He then went into exile in Nigeria. Although opposed to Habré, he returned to Chad in 1985 as part of a policy of national reconciliation, and in 1986 he was named chargé d'affaires to Sudan, serving there until 1988.

Koty then joined the rebel Patriotic Salvation Movement (MPS) and became a member of its Political Bureau. After it seized power in Chad in December 1990, he was promoted to colonel and became army chief of staff. In May 1991 he was appointed to the government as Minister of Defense, Veterans, and War Victims under President Idriss Déby; in December 1991 he was moved to the position of Minister of Public Works and Transport. At an MPS party congress, Koty was elected to the party's Executive Committee and was placed in charge of defense and security.

On June 18, 1992, it was announced that a coup plot being organized by Koty had been thwarted. Koty fled into exile in Cameroon, where he was one of the founders of the National Committee for Recovery (CNR) on June 21. In November 1992, he was elected as the group's president. On August 15, 1993, he signed a peace agreement with the government in Tripoli, Libya, and subsequently returned to Chad. On October 16 he signed a further agreement with the government, providing for the transformation of the CNR into a political party, as well as the integration of group's fighters into the army. On October 22, however, Koty was shot and killed in N'Djamena by security forces. According to the government, he had been plotting a coup and had resisted arrest, but the CNR denied this and said that he was killed because Déby perceived him as a threat due to his popularity. A U.S. State Department human rights report also cast doubt on the official account, alleging that there was "strong evidence that this was a political killing".

References

1952 births
1993 deaths
Chadian rebels